I'm Here, Darlings! is a 1975 Australian TV movie about a woman who believes her stepchildren are behind an unusual series of happenings.

References

External links

Australian television films
1975 television films
1975 films
1970s English-language films
Films directed by Michael Jenkins
1970s Australian films